Moussa Fall (born 28 August 1963) is a retired Senegalese runner who specialized in the 400 and 800 metres.

He was born in Saint-Louis, Senegal. He competed at the 1983 World Championships (400), the 1984 Olympic Games (800), the 1987 World Championships (800) and the 1988 Olympic Games without reaching the final. He also competed in 4 × 400 metres relay at the 1983 World Championships, the 1984 Olympic Games and the 1988 Olympic Games, but the team never reached the final.

Regionally he won silver medals at the 1984 and 1985 African Championships, a gold medal at the 1989 Jeux de la Francophonie and worldwide a silver medal at the 1987 Summer Universiade.

His personal best time was 47.34 seconds in the 400 metres (1989) and 1:44.06 minutes in the 800 metres (1988).

References

1963 births
Living people
Senegalese male sprinters
Senegalese male middle-distance runners
Olympic athletes of Senegal
Athletes (track and field) at the 1984 Summer Olympics
Athletes (track and field) at the 1988 Summer Olympics
World Athletics Championships athletes for Senegal
Universiade medalists in athletics (track and field)
Universiade medalists for Senegal
Sportspeople from Saint-Louis, Senegal
Medalists at the 1987 Summer Universiade